Polinik may refer to:

 Mölltaler Polinik, 2,784 m, a mountain in the Kreuzeck group, Austria
 Gailtaler Polinik, 2,332 m, a mountain in the Carnic Alps